City of Richmond v. United States, 422 U.S. 358 (1975), was a case that upheld Richmond, Virginia's annexation of land from surrounding counties.

See also
List of United States Supreme Court cases, volume 422
Shaw v. Reno
Miller v. Johnson

Further reading

External links
 

United States Supreme Court cases
United States Supreme Court cases of the Burger Court
1975 in United States case law
Legal history of Virginia
History of Richmond, Virginia